The 2006 Newcastle Knights season was the 19th in the club's history. They competed in the NRL's 2006 Telstra Premiership and finished the regular season 4th (out of 15), reaching the semi-finals only to be knocked out by eventual premiers, the Brisbane Broncos.

Season summary
The 2006 season was dominated early by news that coaches Michael Hagan and Brian Smith, who were coaching the Knights and the Parramatta Eels respectively at the time, were to swap clubs from the 2007 season onwards. Coincidentally, this news also dominated prior to their round one meeting in Newcastle, which the Knights won 25-6 (exacting revenge following Parramatta's 50–0 win last year).

On the field, the season was a massive improvement from the 2005 season which netted just eight wins. The Knights were unbeaten after round three and were early-season joint competition leaders with North Queensland and Penrith. Following a hiccup in round four against the New Zealand Warriors, the Knights headed down to Wollongong and thrashed the St. George Illawarra Dragons 54–6; therefore exacting revenge following the Dragons' 48–2 win in 2004 (the first match for Newcastle since Andrew Johns suffered a season-ending knee injury that year). Then came the much anticipated, top-of-the-ladder showdown against the Cowboys pitting Johns against 2005 Dally M Medallist Johnathan Thurston. Unfortuately, Newcastle lost by just 18–16, and Johns was injured yet again. His absence was evident in Newcastle's 52-6 hammering in Melbourne the following week, but wins followed over the South Sydney Rabbitohs and Brisbane Broncos, putting Newcastle's season back on track. The win over the Broncos was achieved two days after Lockyer and Johns played as Australia's halves pairing for the final time.

During the State of Origin period Newcastle suffered a form slump; losing seven of eight matches with a bye sandwiched in between. However, unlike previous years when Michael Hagan was unavailable due to his Queensland Origin commitments, he was fully in charge of the Newcastle team during this period.

Andrew Johns broke the NRL all-time pointscoring record (since broken again by Hazem El Masri) previously held by Jason Taylor, against the Parramatta Eels at Parramatta Stadium in round 18. Coincidentally, Taylor was the Eels relieving coach at the time; but at the conclusion of the match Johns ignored Taylor and the match ball as a commemoration; the possibility being the nature of Newcastle's 46–12 defeat.

Newcastle finished fourth at the end of the regular season, an 11-place improvement from the previous season. They were drawn a home final against the Manly-Warringah Sea Eagles whom the Knights defeated in the famous 1997 ARL Grand Final nine years earlier. Despite trailing 18–6 at halftime, the Knights won its first final since their 2001 Grand Final victory by winning 25–18, but the win came at a cost with hooker Danny Buderus suspended for a spear tackle on Manly winger Michael Robertson, ruling him out of Newcastle's following final against the Brisbane Broncos in what was the last ever Johns vs. Lockyer showdown. The Knights lost 50–6, ending Newcastle's season of improvement.

Overall, Newcastle defeated every team in the top eight except for the first-placed Melbourne Storm.

Match results

References

Newcastle Knights seasons
Newcastle Knights season